Orange River is a river in South Africa.

Orange River may also refer to:

Orange River (Florida)
Orange River (Jamaica)
Orange River (Maine)
Orange River Colony
Orange River Sovereignty
Orange River Convention
Vicariate Apostolic of Orange River
Orange River Rafters, South Africa field hockey club